Sagheer Hamoud ِAhmed Aziz (born 1967), sometimes spelled "Sagher Hamood,or Saghir", commonly known as Sagheer bin Aziz, is a Yemeni politician, MP, and military officer. He is the current chief of the Yemeni Armed Forces Staff. He is also a GPC member in the Yemeni Parliament, for the parliamentary session 2003–2009 for constituency No. (280) B Amran Governorate, north Yemen. On 28 February 2020, he was appointed as Chief of the General Staff of the Yemeni Army and promoted to Lt. Gen.

Early life and education 
Born in Al-Amashyah, Harf Sufyan District, Amran Governorate. He received his primary there, and continued his high education in Sana'a. He got a bachelor in Business Administration from Sanaa University in 2000.

Military education 
 Master's degree in military science, Joint Command and Staff College, Sudan, 2017
 Battalion Commanders' Course, Thulaya Military Institute, Aden
 Company Commanders and Battery Commanders Course, the Republican Guard combat school
 Management and Personnel Affairs course, National Institute of Administrative Sciences, Sanaa, 1989
 Special Forces and Special Forces Instructors Course,  the Republican Guard, 1986
 Thunderbolt Course, the Republican Guard

Political career 
He is a GPC member Members of the Yemeni House of Representatives and elected to the Yemeni Parliament in 1997 and 2003 parliamentary sessions. He is also a member of the National Dialogue Conference.

Military service 
Sagheer bin Azizi joined the military service in the Republican Guard in 1983. He was promoted to the rank of second lieutenant in 1990 then to the rank of Brigadier in the Yemeni Army in 2007.

Main commands 
 Platoon commander, the Republican Guard, Sana'a
 Company commander, the Republican Guard, Sana'a
 Commander of the 1st Armored Division positions in Amshi, Harf Sufyan District, Amran Governorate
 Battalion chief of staff, the Republican Guard camp
 Deputy Chief Teacher, the Republican Guard Combat School
 Head of Tariq's Operations Camp, the Republican Guard
 Deputy chief of staff for training affairs, 2016
 Head of the Government Team in UN Redeployment Coordination Committee in Hudeidah, 2018
 Commander of the Yemeni military Joint Operations, 2019
 Chief of Staff of the Yemeni Army, 28 February 2020 – present

2020 missile attack 
On 27 May 2020, a missile strike targeted the Yemeni army's chief of staff Sagheer bin Aziz during a meeting with military leaders at Sahn al-Jan military base near Marib.  He survived the attack, but his son Fahd Aziz and his nephew Abdul Qawi were killed. Six other soldiers who were accompanying Gen Sagheer were also killed.

References

External links 

Yemeni politicians
Yemeni generals
Yemeni military personnel of the Yemeni Civil War (2014–present)
1967 births
Living people
People from Amran Governorate
Members of the House of Representatives (Yemen)
Chiefs of the General Staff (Yemen)